The men's basketball tournament at the 1971 Pan American Games was held from July 31 to August 12, 1971 in Cali, Colombia.

Men's competition

Participating nations

Preliminary round

†Brazil, Cuba and the United States all finished the preliminary stage with identical 2–1 records. The United States was eliminated, however, on the basis of margins of victory in head-to-head games among the teams tied for first.

Final round

Final ranking

Medalists

Awards

References

 Results
 basketpedya

1971
basketball
1971–72 in South American basketball
1971–72 in North American basketball
International basketball competitions hosted by Colombia